The Hsin Tao Power Corporation is an independent power producer company in Taiwan. It has been involved in the power sales business scheme with Taipower for over 25 years.

Power plants
 Hsintao Power Plant in Guangxi Township, Hsinchu County.

See also

 Electricity sector in Taiwan
 List of power stations in Taiwan

References 

1998 establishments in Taiwan
Electric power companies of Taiwan
Taiwanese companies established in 1998
Marubeni